Gerald Roland Reid (November 18, 1928 – March 26, 1971) was a Canadian professional ice hockey player who played two games in the National Hockey League with the Detroit Red Wings during the 1949 playoffs. The rest of his career, which lasted from 1946 to 1957, was spent in the minor leagues.

He died in 1971, aged 42. He was buried at Greenwood Cemetery in Owen Sound.

Career statistics

Regular season and playoffs

References

External links
 

1928 births
1971 deaths
Barrie Flyers players
Canadian ice hockey centres
Cleveland Barons (1937–1973) players
Detroit Red Wings players
Ice hockey people from Ontario
Indianapolis Capitals players
Ontario Hockey Association Senior A League (1890–1979) players
Sportspeople from Owen Sound